Wyn Jones (born 26 February 1992) is a Welsh rugby union player who plays for Scarlets regional team as a prop.

Jones made his debut for the Scarlets regional team in 2014 having previously played for Llandovery RFC over 70 times.

Early life 
Jones was born and raised in Llandovery and attended Aberystwyth University.

Club career 
Jones joined Scarlets on the 1st July 2013 following three years at amateurs side Llandovery. He was part of the Pro12 winning Scarlets side in the 2016/17 season and the side that lost in the final the following year.

International
In May 2017 Jones was named in the Wales senior squad for the tests against Tonga and Samoa in June 2017. He won the Six Nations Grand Slam with Wales in 2019. He was selected by Warren Gatland as part of the Wales squad for the 2019 Rugby World Cup where started three out of four group games. He also started both the quarter final win against France and semi final loss to South Africa before dropping to the bench for the 3rd place playoff loss to New Zealand. In 2021, Jones was part of Wayne Pivac's Six Nations Championship winning side.

International tries

References

External links

Scarlets Player Profile

1992 births
Living people
Rugby union players from Llandovery
Scarlets players
Wales international rugby union players
Welsh rugby union players
Rugby union props
British & Irish Lions rugby union players from Wales